Abu'l-Faḍl (Abu'l-Hasan) ibn al-Khashshab (died 1125) was the Shi'i qadi and rais of Aleppo during the rule of the Seljuk emir Radwan.

His family, the Banu'l-Khashshab, were wealthy wood-merchants in the city. Upon the arrival of the First Crusade, Ibn al-Khashshab was one of the first to preach jihad against the Crusaders, a concept which became more popular throughout the 12th century. His preaching was popular among the masses, but Radwan, along with his Assassin advisors, were not willing to wage battle against the newly formed Crusader states. Aleppo was continually threatened by the Crusaders and eventually Radwan was humiliated by Tancred of Antioch, forced to place crosses on the minarets of some of the mosques in the city.

Ibn al-Khashshab had sought help from the Abbasid caliph in Baghdad, al-Mustazhir, but each time his requests were ignored; finally, in 1111, he travelled to Baghdad to seek help from the caliph in person. He instigated a riot and destroyed the pulpit of the minbar in the private mosques of the Seljuk sultan Muhammad I Tapar and the caliph. In response, the sultan ordered Mawdud, the atabeg of Mosul, to come to Aleppo's aid, and Ibn al-Khashshab returned home. However, Radwan did not want Mawdud interfering in his affairs, and had Ibn al-Khashshab imprisoned; Mawdud and Radwan could not cooperate and Mawdud returned home.

When Radwan died in 1113, Ibn al-Khashshab governed the city in place of weak or child emirs. He helped rid the city of the Assassins, by expulsion or execution. When the Crusaders threatened the city again in 1119, Ibn al-Khashshab negotiated an alliance with Ilghazi of the Artuqid dynasty in Mesopotamia, and the Principality of Antioch was defeated at the Battle of Ager Sanguinis that year. Ibn al-Khashshab personally led Aleppan troops in the battle.

The crusaders besieged Aleppo in 1124, and when they desecrated the Mashhad al-Muhassin outside the city, Ibn al-Khashshab ordered that four of the six Christian churches in the city, including the sixth-century Syrian cathedral, be converted into mosques. The besiegers, led by Baldwin II of Jerusalem and Joscelin I of Edessa, were allied with the Muslim Dubais ibn Sadaqa, whom Ibn al-Khashshab publicly denounced. The siege was eventually raised with help from Aqsunqur al-Bursuqi, atabeg of Mosul, in 1125. Later that year, following massacres of Nizaris by Ibn al-Khashshab, he was murdered by Assassins. The next year Aleppo fell under the control of Zengi, who began to implement the jihad that ibn al-Khashshab had so fervently preached.

Notes

References

Sources

Carole Hillenbrand, The Crusades, Islamic Perspectives. New York, 2000.
P.M. Holt, The Age of the Crusades: The Near East from the Eleventh Century to 1517. New York, 1986.
Amin Maalouf, The Crusades Through Arab Eyes. 1983

1125 deaths
Muslims of the First Crusade
12th-century Syrian people
Year of birth unknown
People from Aleppo
People of the Nizari–Seljuk wars
12th-century Shia Muslims
Victims of the Order of Assassins